Urban Garden is a sculpture by Ginny Ruffner, installed in Seattle, Washington, United States. It depicts a pot, flowers, and watering can. The 27-foot-tall kinetic sculpture was commissioned by the Sheraton Seattle Hotel and weighs approximately 10,000 pounds. The pot is 9 feet tall and 7 feet wide.

References

2011 establishments in Washington (state)
2011 sculptures
Downtown Seattle
Kinetic sculptures in the United States
Outdoor sculptures in Seattle
Plants in art